William Joseph Schmidt, Jr (March 6, 1926 – April 25, 2009) was an American composer, arranger and publisher of classical music.

He was born in Chicago, Illinois. He produced a large body of solo and chamber works for neglected woodwind, brass, and percussion instruments, including several pieces for classical saxophone.

According to the Classical Composers Database, "William Schmidt was a student of Ingolf Dahl at the University of Southern California where he earned a Master of Music degree in composition. Throughout his career, he has been the recipient of numerous awards and commissions."  His Double Concerto for Trumpet, Piano and Chamber Orchestra was nominated for a Pulitzer Prize in 1981.

Schmidt operated his own publishing company, Western International Music Inc., in Greeley, Colorado.

Recordings
Mary Ann Covert & Steven Mauk - Tenor Excursions (1995)
Trio Chromos - Trumpet Colors (2007)

References

External links
William Scmidt's death notice, published in the New York Times
The web site of Western International Music, Inc.
Interview with William Schmidt, October 1, 1987

1926 births
2009 deaths
20th-century classical composers
21st-century classical composers
American male classical composers
American classical composers
Chicago Musical College alumni
21st-century American composers
USC Thornton School of Music alumni
20th-century American composers
20th-century American male musicians
21st-century American male musicians